The 2010 Minnesota Attorney General election was held on Tuesday, November 2, 2010, to elect the Minnesota Attorney General for a four-year term. Primary elections were held on August 10, 2010. Incumbent Lori Swanson of the Minnesota Democratic–Farmer–Labor Party (DFL) won reelection to a second term.

Candidates

Democratic–Farmer–Labor Party
Incumbent Lori Swanson won endorsement at the Minnesota Democratic–Farmer–Labor Party (DFL) convention. She faced only token opposition in her party's primary from Leo F. Meyer, and easily won her party's nomination in the August 10 primary.

Republican Party
Edina attorney and psychologist Chris Barden earned the endorsement of the Republican Party of Minnesota at its state convention. He was challenged in his party's primary by Sharon Anderson, a perennial candidate who won her party's endorsement for attorney general in 1994. In the August 10 primary, Barden earned 54% of the vote to defeat Anderson and earn his party's nomination.

Independence Party
Activist Bill Dahn, who has no formal legal education, was the only candidate seeking the office of Attorney General as a member of the Independence Party of Minnesota.

Resource Party
Activist David J. Hoch ran in the election for the Resource Party.

Results

References

External links
 Minnesota Secretary of State - Elections & Voting

Attorney General
Minnesota Attorney General elections
Minnesota